Events from the year 1883 in France.

Incumbents
President: Jules Grévy 
President of the Council of Ministers: 
 until 29 January: Charles Duclerc 
 29 January-21 February: Armand Fallières
 starting 21 February: Jules Ferry

Events
 27–28 March – Battle of Gia Cuc, French victory over Vietnamese forces.
 19 May – Battle of Paper Bridge, French defeat by Black Flag forces.
 25 August – Treaty of Hué signed between the Nguyễn dynasty Emperor of Viet Nam and the French Empire, recognizing French imperial control over the regions of Annam and Tonkin.
 De Dion-Bouton set up in Paris to manufacture mechanical road vehicles.
 The first purebred Percheron (horse) stud book is created.

Births

January to June
 5 January – Marie-Louise Bouglé, feminist, librarian, and archivist (died 1936)
 3 February – Camille Bombois, naïve painter (died 1970)
 18 February – Jacques Ochs, artist, épée and foil fencer and Olympic gold medallist (died 1971)
 15 May – Maurice Feltin, Cardinal (died 1975)
 28 June – Pierre Laval, politician and Prime Minister (executed) (died 1945)

July to December
 19 July – Louis Paulhan, pilot (died 1963)
 25 July – Louis Massignon, scholar and historian of Islam (died 1962)
 19 August – Coco Chanel, fashion designer (died 1971)
 14 September – Rose Combe, writer and railway worker (died 1932)
 14 December – Robert Péguy, film director (died 1968)
 16 December – Max Linder, actor (died 1925)
 17 December – Raimu, actor (died 1946)
 19 December – Abel Bonnard, poet, novelist and politician (died 1968)
 22 December – Edgard Varèse, composer (died 1965)
 26 December – Maurice Utrillo, painter (died 1955)

Full date unknown
 Charles Jourdan, fashion designer (died 1976)

Deaths
 4 January – Antoine Chanzy, general and governor of Algeria (born 1823)
 23 January – Gustave Doré, artist, engraver, illustrator and sculptor (born 1832)
 17 February – Napoléon Coste, guitarist and composer (born 1805)
 24 April – Jules Sandeau, novelist (born 1811)
 30 April – Édouard Manet, painter (born 1832)
 5 May  – Louis Viardot, writer, art historian and critic, theatrical figure, hispanophile and translator (born 1800)
 11 May  – Juliette Drouet, actress, mistress and secretary of Victor Hugo (born 1806)
 19 May – Henri Rivière, Naval officer and writer (born 1827)
 25 May – Édouard René de Laboulaye, jurist (born 1811)
 20 June – Gustave Aimard, traveller and writer (born 1818)
 11 August – Edouard Louis Dubufe, painter (born 1820)
 24 August – Henri, comte de Chambord, Legitimist Pretender to the throne of France (born 1820)
 6 September – Auguste Arnaud, sculptor (born 1825)
 29 October – Henri-Marie-Gaston Boisnormand de Bonnechose, Cardinal (born 1800)
 27 November – Charles Théodore Colet, Roman Catholic Archbishop (born 1806)

References

1880s in France